Bearsville is a hamlet in Ulster County, New York, United States, in the town of Woodstock. It is located along New York State Route 212, within Catskill State Park and just to the west of the hamlet of Woodstock.

Bearsville was named not for the numerous local black bears, but for German peddler and storekeeper Christian Baehr, who built a store on the Sawkill Creek in 1839. 

Places of interest in Bearsville, or named for it, include Bearsville Records and Bearsville Studios, and The Bearsville Theater and restaurant complex.

References

Woodstock, New York
Hamlets in Ulster County, New York